The Tokens were an American doo-wop band and record production company group from Brooklyn, New York City. The group has had four top 40 hits on the Billboard Hot 100, all in the 1960s, their biggest being the chart-topping 1961 hit single "The Lion Sleeps Tonight". "The Lion Sleeps Tonight" borrowed heavily from the 1939 song "Mbube" by South African singer Solomon Linda. They are also known for having included at first Neil Sedaka, who later pursued a solo career.

History
The band was formed in 1955 at Abraham Lincoln High School in Brooklyn, New York, and was known first as the Linc-Tones, a name inspired by the President of the United States' surname. The original members were Neil Sedaka, Hank Medress, Eddie Rabkin, and Cynthia Zolotin; however, Rabkin was replaced in 1956 by Jay Siegel. In the same year the band recorded its first single, "While I Dream", with Sedaka on lead vocals; the song was a local hit in New York. Sedaka and Howard Greenfield wrote much of the group's early material. They were unusual among teen vocal bands of the time because they were not a cover one. In 1957, Zolotin left the band. Briefly recording as the Tokens and the Coins, Sedaka left the group in 1958 to launch his solo career. Siegel and Medress then recorded three singles under a side project for Roulette Records, Darrell & the Oxfords in 1959, with two other musicians who never joined the band. Finally establishing its most famous name and line-up, the group became known as the Tokens in 1960 after recruiting the 13-year-old multi-instrumentalist and first tenor Mitch Margo and his baritone brother Philip "Phil" Margo.

In early 1961, the Tokens released a single for Warwick Records titled "Tonight I Fell In Love", which scored No. 15 on the Billboard Hot 100 chart and earned the group an opportunity to perform on the television program American Bandstand. The popularity that the band garnered as a result of this performance brought it new recording opportunities, culminating in its cover of Solomon Linda's "The Lion Sleeps Tonight" for RCA Victor Records. It reached No. 1 on the Billboard Hot 100 chart, where it remained for three weeks. The same track peaked at No. 11 in the UK Singles Chart. Both "Tonight I Fell in Love" and "The Lion Sleeps Tonight" sold more than one million copies, and were awarded gold discs.

From 1962 to 1970, the group released nine more songs that scored the Top 100. Jay Siegel was the lead vocalist on all the Tokens' hits including "I Hear Trumpets Blow" (1966) and "Portrait of My Love" (1967). Beginning in 1963, the Tokens also began serving as record producers for other artists, such as the Chiffons, Randy & the Rainbows and the Happenings. Their production company was called "Bright Tunes" and they also created their own record company, B.T. (Bright Tunes) Puppy Records. In 1968, The Tokens released the experimental "Animal", intended to serve as lead single for a self-produced album entitled Intercourse. However, the single flopped and Warner Bros. Records rejected the album due to its uncommercial nature and sexual overtones, and so in 1971 the band privately pressed 200 copies of Intercourse themselves through B.T. Puppy. In 1972, Jay Siegel did background vocals for a re-recording of the Lion Sleeps Tonight with Robert John as the lead vocalist. This version hit No. 3 on the chart and was awarded a Gold disc.

In 1970, Hank Medress began producing an act for Bell Records, Dawn, which featured the former teen idol Tony Orlando. It was as a favor to Medress that Orlando sang lead on the first record, "Candida", which became a Top 3 hit. In 1973, Medress ended his relationship with the group and Siegel teamed with the Margo Brothers to form the group Cross Country, which had some success with its cover version of "In the Midnight Hour". The Tokens occasionally reunited during 1975 as singing regulars on the Adam Wade-hosted game show Musical Chairs and in 1978 recorded "A Victim of Gravity" for ABC's Schoolhouse Rock.

Brothers Mitch and Philip Margo continued to perform with new members Jay Leslie, Mike Johnson, and Noah Margo (one of Phil Margo's sons) who played drums. Mitch Margo's sons, Damien Margo and Ari Margo, also made occasional guest performances with the band, exemplifying Phil Margo's saying: "If you hang around long enough you can grow your own band". Siegel continues to perform with his own version of the Tokens.  Until 2022 Siegel's Tokens performed featuring bass singer Bill Reid, who had previously sang background with The Halos and had featured on some early '60's top hits including Curtis Lee's "Pretty Little Angel Eyes" as well as Barry Mann's "Who Put the Bomp". Siegel brought in John "Jay" Traynor, the original lead singer (before Jay Black) of Jay & the Americans and the Mystics who sang with Siegel's Tokens until 2014. Siegel's son was also part of the group as keyboardist and occasional vocalist. The current members of Jay Siegel's Tokens are Kurt Frenchie Yaghjian and Gabriel Dassa. Yaghjian appeared in the original Broadway cast of Jesus Christ Superstar and film version of Hair. Dassa is an orthopedic surgeon and sings with the a cappella group Classic Sounds.

Jay Siegel's Tokens and the Margo brothers reunited in 2000 to perform on the PBS special, Doo Wop 51. At the time, Siegel's Tokens were Siegel, Reid and Eddy Rezzonico, who had replaced Richie Grasso during the 1990s.

Band member Hank Medress died of lung cancer on June 18, 2007, at his Manhattan home, aged 68. John "Jay" Traynor died of liver cancer on January 2, 2014, at a hospital in Tampa, Florida, aged 70. Mitch Margo died of natural causes on November 24, 2017, at Studio City, California, also aged 70. Philip Margo died of a stroke on November 13, 2021, at a hospital in Los Angeles, aged 79. Bass singer Bill Reid of Jay Siegel's Tokens suffered a heart attack on April 11, 2022, and died shortly afterwards.

Legal controversies

Rights for "The Lion Sleeps Tonight"
Decades after not receiving any publishing credit for their specific original musical composition part of "The Lion Sleeps Tonight", the band began a lawsuit in order to regain some of these publishing rights. The case was dismissed due to the statute of limitations. To this day, the Tokens claim that some of the original musical composition of the 1961 song was created by them, even though they have not been awarded this status by their record company.

Name of the band
On October 19, 2009, Phil and Mitch Margo filed suit in Manhattan for the rights to the Tokens name. They claim in their filing that Henry Medress suggested the name. In a competing suit filed in California by Siegel, he claims Siegel, Medress and Sedaka released an album named Neil Sedaka and the Tokens previously. On Sedaka's own website, there is a listing in his discography catalog for a 1958 release of Neil Sedaka and the Tokens as well as a second album, also during 1958, named Neil Sedaka and the Tokens and Coins. Sedaka and Siegel have remained close friends since Sedaka left the group.

Discography

Albums

Notes

Singles

 APeaked at No. 39 on the WMGM chart
 CPeaked at No. 27 on RPM Adult Contemporary chart

Production work
As well as being performing and recording artists the Tokens were also record producers. Here are some of the records they produced:
"He's So Fine" by the Chiffons
"One Fine Day" by the Chiffons
"Denise" by Randy & the Rainbows
"See You In September" by the Happenings
"I Got Rhythm" by the Happenings
"Go Away Little Girl" by the Happenings
"Candida" by Tony Orlando and Dawn
"Knock Three Times" by Tony Orlando and Dawn
"Tie a Yellow Ribbon Round the Ole Oak Tree" by Tony Orlando and Dawn

Awards and recognition
The Tokens were inducted into the Vocal Group Hall of Fame in 2004.

In 1998, the Tokens were mentioned by the Guinness World Records for performing "The Star-Spangled Banner" at all 30 Major League Baseball stadiums in the United States and Canada.

References

External links

1955 establishments in New York City
1978 disestablishments in New York (state)
American rhythm and blues musical groups
Doo-wop groups
Musical groups established in 1955
Musical groups disestablished in 1978
People from Brighton Beach
Neil Sedaka
Musical groups from Brooklyn
B.T. Puppy Records artists
Buddah Records artists
RCA Victor artists
Warner Records artists